Kushtia-2 is a constituency represented in the Jatiya Sangsad (National Parliament) of Bangladesh since 2008 by Hasanul Haq Inu of the Jatiya Samajtantrik Dal.

Boundaries 
The constituency encompasses Bheramara and Mirpur upazilas.

History 
The constituency was created for the first general elections in newly independent Bangladesh, held in 1973.

Members of Parliament

Elections

Elections in the 2010s 
Hasanul Haq Inu was re-elected unopposed in the 2014 general election after opposition parties withdrew their candidacies in a boycott of the election.

Elections in the 2000s

Elections in the 1990s

References

External links
 

Parliamentary constituencies in Bangladesh
Kushtia District